Social Distance is an American streaming television anthology series created by Hilary Weisman Graham that premiered on October 15, 2020 on Netflix. The series was "conceived, cast and executed entirely remotely during quarantine". The eight-part series, set during the first months of the COVID-19 pandemic, focuses on how families, friends, and couples were forced to cope with the effects of quarantine as well as the Black Lives Matter protests following the murder of George Floyd. Each episode tells a different story and shows "the power of the human spirit in the face of uncertainty and isolation," and how technology was used to stay connected during quarantine.

Episodes

Season 1 (2020)

Reception
For the series, review aggregator Rotten Tomatoes reported an approval rating of 55% based on 11 reviews, with an average rating of 6.75/10. Metacritic gave the series a weighted average score of 56 out of 100 based on 11 reviews, indicating "mixed or average reviews".

References

External links 
 

2020s American anthology television series
2020 American television series debuts
Television shows about the COVID-19 pandemic
English-language Netflix original programming
Anthology web series